Korisos (before 1919: Γκορένση - Gkorensi) is a village in Kastoria Regional Unit, Macedonia, Greece.

The Greek census (1920) recorded 1921 people in the village and in 1923 there were 650 inhabitants (or 75 families) who were Muslim. Following the Greek-Turkish population exchange, in 1926 within the village there were refugee families from East Thrace (5), Asia Minor (67) and Pontus (15). The Greek census (1928) recorded 1468 village inhabitants. There were 88 refugee families (358 people) in 1928.

References

Populated places in Kastoria (regional unit)